Abdullah Ghafoor (born 2 February 1986) is a Pakistani weightlifter.

Family
Ghafoor is the son of Abdul Gahfoor and the younger brother of Mohammad Istiaq Ghafoor, both of whom have represented Pakistan internationally in weightlifting.

Career

2010
Ghafoor won a bronze medal at the 2010 South Asian Games held in Dhaka, Bangladesh.

Ghafoor participated in the 56 kg category at the 2010 Commonwealth Games in New Delhi, India where he placed fourth with 237 kg total weight lifted. The following month, he represented the country at the Asian Games in China.

References

External links 
 
 
 

1986 births
Living people
Pakistani male weightlifters
Asian Games competitors for Pakistan
Weightlifters at the 2010 Asian Games
Commonwealth Games competitors for Pakistan
Weightlifters at the 2010 Commonwealth Games
Weightlifters at the 2018 Commonwealth Games
South Asian Games bronze medalists for Pakistan
South Asian Games medalists in weightlifting